Luis Alberto Spinetta (1950–2012) was an Argentine singer-songwriter.

Spinetta may refer to:

People
 Dante Spinetta (born 1976), Argentine singer-songwriter
 Jean-Cyril Spinetta (born 1943), French businessman, Chairman and CEO of Air France-KLM

Other uses
 Spinetta, a type of Italian virginals